Enthini Pookunna Pookkal is a 1982 Indian Malayalam-language family drama film directed by Gopinath Babu and written by A. Sheriff. It stars Mohanlal, Mammootty, Ratheesh and Zarina Wahab. The film features music composed by Shyam.

Plot

Savithri (Zarina Wahab) works as a maid for Surendran (Mohanlal) and his mother (Sukumari). Sivaraman (Mammootty) is Savithri's neighbour who is like a brother to her. Sivaraman and Surendran hate each other. Surendran is a stone-hearted and abusive youngster who Savithri doesn't love. Surendran however deceives Savithri with false promises and gets her pregnant, and later throws her out of his house.

Sivaraman takes Savithri into his house (treating her like his own sister). Savithri gives birth to a baby boy, who dies shortly afterwards.

Vishwanathan (Ratheesh) is a factory owner who is a single parent of his only daughter. Sivaraman works in his factory and after Viswanathan meets Savithri, he wants to marry her, as his daughter likes Savithri. Sivaraman gets Savithri married to Vishwanathan and persuades her not to reveal her past (despite her intention to so).

Surendran happens to be Vishwanathan's old friend, and they meet after a long time. Surendran lies to Vishwanathan that Savithri had illicit relations with Sivaraman, and that Sivaraman is not her actually her brother.

Viswanathan gets angry with both Savithri and Sivaraman, accusing them of deceiving him. Sivaraman however convinces Viswanathan that Surendran is the one who is lying and that he was the one who had impregnated Savithri. He also tells that it was him who persuaded Savithri not to reveal her past (despite Savithri wanting to do so). Viswanathan and Savithri reconcile.

In the climax, Surendran tries to molest Savithri again, but Savithri slaps him in the face and closes the door. Vishwanathan hears about this and he is ready to kill Surendran. Sivaraman enters the scene and defeats Surendran in a fight once again and stabs him. Surendran then dies.  This film ends with Sivaraman reconciling with Savithri and Vishwanathan.

Cast 

Mohanlal as Surendran
Mammootty as Sivaraman
Ratheesh as Vishwanathan
Zarina Wahab as Savithri
Sukumari
Sankaradi as Kurupp
Mala Aravindan as Pillai
Santhakumari as Madhavi
Sathyachithra as Prameela
Baby Sonia
Sudha as Sumathi
Vijayan Pallikkara
 Stalin
 Master Rivins
 Sudha

Soundtrack 
The music was composed by Shyam and the lyrics were written by Poovachal Khader.

Release
The film was released on 6 August 1982.

References

External links 
 
 Watch on Hotstar

1982 films
1980s Malayalam-language films
Films scored by Shyam (composer)
Films shot in Thrissur